Chalbori-ppang ("glutinous barley bread") is a South Korean confection, consisting of two small pancakes made with glutinous barley flour wrapped around a filling of red bean paste. The round, flat, mildly sweet confection has a texture similar to that of a glutinous sponge cake.

Chalbori-ppang, first made and sold in 2003 at a bakery named Danseokga in Gyeongju, North Gyeongsang Province, is now a local specialty. It utilizes the glutinous barley harvested in fields under Danseoksan (Mt. Danseok), which is pesticide-free as barley grows in cold winter months during which pests and weeds cannot flourish.

Gallery

See also 
 Hwangnam-ppang
 Dorayaki, similar confectionery from Japan

References 

Barley-based dishes
South Korean breads
South Korean snack foods
Pancakes